Air Commodore Charles Beausoliel was a Ghanaian air force personnel and served in the Ghana Air Force. He was the Chief of Air Staff of the Ghana Air Force from January to December 1971.

References

Chiefs of Air Staff (Ghana)
Ghanaian military personnel
Ghana Air Force personnel